Filmapalooza is the finale festival for the 48 Hour Film Project in which the winning films from cities worldwide (150 cities as of 2018) are screened the following year and compete with each other for awards.  It has existed since 2003.

Filmapalooza is hosted by a different city each year. The most recent Filmapalooza, in 2020, was held in Rotterdam, Netherlands.

Filmapalooza events

Winners

Best film

See also
List of film festivals
48 Hour Film Project

References

External links
48 Hour Film Project Official Site

Film festivals held in multiple countries
Film competitions
Short film festivals in the United States